Vranjic is a village north of Split, near the mouth of Jadro River, administratively located in the Town of Solin. Because of its beauty it was nicknamed "Little Venice". The church of Saint Martin, the pope, is a place of cultural heritage, with sacred folk music performers Crkveni pjevači župe sv. Martina - Vranjic. 

Vranjic is the birthplace of one of the greatest archaeologists for early Christianity  Don Frane Bulić. Klapa Hurania (Latin name for Vranjic) also comes from the village. There is a small rustic villa there, leading people to believe that Vranjic was a vacation destination for rich Salonitan citizens (Salona  Colonia Martia of Iulius Caesar, the present-day town of Solin). 

As of 2011 census, Vranjic has a population of 1,110.

Notable people 

 dr. Frane Bulić, archeologist, historian and Roman Catholic priest
 don Luka Jelić
 msgr. Ante Jurić
 Stjepan Benzon, poet

Industry 

The former Salonit factory produced asbestos material since 1921. There is also a warehouse of Karlovačka pivovara and INA reservoirs.

Sport 
 NK Omladinac Vranjic, football club
 VK Vranjic, waterpolo club
 RK Piaggio, handball club

References

Footnotes

Sources

External links

Populated places in Split-Dalmatia County
Populated coastal places in Croatia